Kolathur may refer to:

Kolathur, Chennai, Tamil Nadu, India 
Kolathur, Salem, Tamil Nadu, India
Kolathur, Tiruvannamalai, Tamil Nadu, India 
Kolathur, Kerala, India